Launch Complex 1 (LC-1) is a deactivated launch site on the eastern tip of Cape Canaveral Space Force Station, Florida. It was constructed, with launch complexes 2, 3, and 4, in the early 1950s for the Snark missile program.

The first launch from this site was a Snark test, conducted on January 13, 1955. The complex was used for Snark missions until 1960, and then was utilized as a helicopter pad during Project Mercury. The final use of the site was from 1983 to 1989 for tethered aerostat balloon radar missions.

References

External links 
Encyclopedia Astronautica

Cape Canaveral Space Force Station
1950s establishments in Florida